State Route 2 (SR 2) is a  east-west state highway in the far northern part of the U.S. state of Georgia. The highway serves southern suburbs of Chattanooga, Tennessee, as well as much of the mountainous area in the northern part of the state. It traverses the counties of Walker, Catoosa, Whitfield, Murray, Gilmer, Fannin, Union, Towns, and Rabun. It connects Flintstone, in the northwestern part of the state, with the South Carolina state line southeast of Clayton in the northern part and the northeastern part of the state. It also travels through Fort Oglethorpe, Ringgold, Ellijay, Blue Ridge, Blairsville, and Hiawassee. Parts of the highway in the Whitfield and Murray county area are designated as the Cohutta–Chattahoochee Scenic Byway.

Route description

SR 2 begins at an intersection with SR 193 in the community of Flintstone, the route travels east along Battlefield Parkway (with a portion of it named after Chief Deputy Baxter Shavers), with a brief concurrency with US 27/SR 1. It then has an interchange with Interstate 75 (I-75), before reaching US 41/US 76/SR 3. After a brief concurrency with US 41/US 76/SR 3 through Ringgold, SR 2 splits off in Stone Church and continues east. After crossing the Conasauga River, the route has another brief concurrency with SR 225, then continues a short distance east to US 411/SR 61 in the community of Cisco. SR 2 travels concurrent with US 411/SR 61 to Chatsworth. In Chatsworth, SR 2 travels concurrent with SR 52 to the east past Fort Mountain to Ellijay. Here, SR 2 begins a lengthy concurrency with US 76 to the South Carolina state line. US 76/SR 2/SR 5/SR 515, travel to the northeast to Blue Ridge. In town, SR 5 departs to the north, while US 76/SR 2/SR 515 continue east to Blairsville. East of Blairsville, the concurrency arcs to the north, then east, around Brasstown Bald. West of Hiawassee, SR 515 departs to the north, and US 76/SR 2 are joined by SR 17, then SR 75 in Hiawassee. East of Hiawassee, SR 17/SR 75 depart to the south, and US 76/SR 2 continue east through a series of switchbacks over the Eastern Continental Divide to Clayton. At this point, US 76/SR 2 have a brief concurrency with US 23/US 441/SR 15. The two highways curve to the southeast and meet the eastern terminus of SR 2, the South Carolina state line. Here, US 76 continues toward Westminster.

The following portions of SR 2 are part of the National Highway System, a system of routes determined to be the most important for the nation's economy, mobility, and defense:
From the western end of the US 27 concurrency, on the Fairview–Fort Oglethorpe line, to the I-75 interchange in Ringgold
The brief US 76 concurrency, on US 411/SR 52, in Chatsworth
From the western end of the US 76 concurrency, in East Ellijay, to the eastern end of the US 23/US 441/SR 15 concurrency in Clayton

History

1920s
SR 2 was established at least as early as 1919. Then, it started at an intersection with SR 1 in LaFayette. It traveled east-northeast to Dalton. It then followed its current path to nearby Chatsworth. It then took a more southerly route to Ellijay. It also followed its current path to Clayton. It is unclear as to whether it traversed the Clayton–South Carolina path at this time. By the end of 1921, the LaFayette–Dalton and Chatsworth–Ellijay segments were removed from the state highway. Traffic had to travel south-southeast to Fairmount. There, it traveled to the east-northeast, concurrent with SR 53 to a point northwest of Talking Rock. At that point, SR 53 ended and SR 2 began a concurrency with SR 5 north-northeast through Ellijay to Blue Ridge. Also, it was proposed to be extended northeast from Clayton to Pine Mountain. In 1926, the eastern part of the Dalton–Chatsworth segment and nearly the entire Hiawassee–Clayton segment had a "sand clay or top soil" surface. The rest of this segment had a "completed semi hard surface". Almost the entire western half of the Blue Ridge–Blairsville segment had a "completed hard surface", with the center of this segment having a completed semi hard surface. Nearly the entire Blairsville–Young Harris segment was under construction. In 1929, a different path between LaFayette and Dalton was re-added to the highway. It followed the current path of SR 136 and SR 201 east-southeast from LaFayette to Villanow and north-northeast to Dalton. About two-thirds of the LaFayette–Villanow segment had a completed semi hard surface. Also, The Clayton–Pine Mountain segment was cancelled.

1930s
In the middle of 1930, the eastern part of the Dalton–Chatsworth segment had a completed hard surface. The Chatsworth–Ellijay segment was re-added to the highway. The western half of the Blairsville–Young Harris segment had a completed semi hard surface, with the eastern half, as well as the Young Harris–Hiawassee segment completed. The eastern part of the Hiawassee–Clayton segment was under construction. By the end of the year, the entire LaFayette–Villanow segment had a completed semi hard surface. US 41 and SR 3 began a concurrency with SR 2 within Dalton. The center part of the Blue Ridge–Blairsville segment had a sand clay or top soil surface. The eastern part of this segment was under construction. The entire Blairsville–Hiawassee segment was completed. The next year, the part of the highway just north-northeast of Villanow was indicated as "completed grading, no surface course". The rest of the Villanow–Dalton segment was under construction. The western part of the Dalton–Chatsworth segment had a completed semi hard surface. The entire Chatsworth–Ellijay segment was also under construction. The western half of the Ellijay–Blue Ridge segment had a sand clay or top soil surface, with the rest of this segment completed. By August 1932, the eastern part of the Blue Ridge–Blairsville segment had a completed semi hard surface. The entire Hiawassee–Clayton segment had a sand clay or top soil surface. Also the Clayton–South Carolina segment was built, and was signed as SR 2. By the end of 1933, the entire Dalton–Chatsworth segment was completed. In the third quarter of 1934, SR 2 was extended west-northwest to Davis Crossroads. The entire LaFayette–Dalton segment has a completed semi hard surface. By the end of the year, US 76 was designated along SR 2 from Chatsworth to Clayton. It was unclear if the Clayton–South Carolina segment was part of US 76 at this time, though. By October 1937, the entire Union County section of the Blue Ridge–Blairsville segment was completed. Before the year ended, SR 2 was extended slightly farther to the northwest from its western terminus. Late in 1938, the entire part northwest of LaFayette and the entire Chatsworth–Ellijay segment was "completed grading, not surfaced". By the middle of 1939, the highway was extended northwest just a little more, to an intersection with SR 157 near Ascalon. By the end of 1939, the roadway was extended northwest to Trenton, but it was unclear whether it was part of SR 2.

1940s
By April 1940, the entire Trenton area segment was completed grading, not surfaced. The entire Ellijay–Blue Ridge segment, as well as nearly all of the Rabun County part of the Hiawassee–Clayton segment, was completed. Parts of the roadway on either side of the SR 157 intersection, the entire Whitfield County section of the LaFayette–Dalton segment, the entire Blue Ridge–Blairsville segment, and nearly the entire Rabun County section of the Hiawassee–Clayton segment, were completed. By 1941 started, SR 157 was shifted farther to the east, with the former alignment being redesignated as SR 170. From just northwest of this intersection southeast to the new intersection with SR 157. A little later in the year, SR 2 was completed slightly to the southeast of the SR 157 intersection. By the end of 1946, US 76 was designated along the Clayton–South Carolina segment. By April 1949, SR 2 was shifted to an entirely different alignment west of Blue Ridge. The entire segment from Trenton to Villanow was redesignated as SR 143, and the former State Route 148 (between Ringgold and Ft. Oglethorpe) was newly designated State Route 2. This segment (From highway 41 north of Ringgold to highway 27 north of Fort Oglethorpe) was called Georgia 2 Alternate. To this day, some longtime local residents persist in calling this segment "2A", which can be confusing, this stems from the time the road was designated as  Georgia 2 Alternate and was signed "2A". The entire Villanow–Dalton segment was redesignated as SR 201. SR 2's new western terminus was at US 27/SR 1 in Chickamauga Park. It traveled through Ringgold and intersected SR 71 in Varnell. It went northeast to US 411/SR 61 in Cisco. It took a winding path through the Chattahoochee National Forest and intersected SR 5 northwest of Blue Ridge. The two highways traveled concurrently into Blue Ridge, where it resumed its former alignment. The entire Chickamauga Park–Ringgold segment, and the SR 5 concurrency, was hard surfaced. From Ringgold to the Whitfield–Murray county line, and from east of Cisco to northwest of Blue Ridge, the highway had a sand clay, top soil, or stabilized earth surface. From the Whitfield–Murray county line to east of Cisco, the highway was machine graded and maintained.

1950s to 1980s
By the end of 1953, nearly all of the Ringgold–Varnell segment of SR 2 was hard surfaced. By the middle of 1957, a short section northeast of Blue Ridge was paved. By the middle of 1960, about half of the Varnell–Cisco segment was paved. Between 1963 and 1966, the entire section from Higdon to SR 5 was paved. In 1970, the entire segment west of Gregory was paved. By 1974, the segment between Cisco and Higdon was impassable due to rock slides. In 1986, SR 2 was re-routed south-southwest along US 411/SR 61 from Cisco to Chatsworth, where it began a concurrency with US 76/SR 52. US 76/SR 2/SR 52 traveled to the east and southeast into Ellijay, where SR 52 departed the concurrency. US 76/SR 2 turned left onto SR 5. They entered Blue Ridge. Here, SR 5 departed the concurrency, and US 76/SR 2 headed east as previously. In 1989, SR 515 was designated along US 76/SR 2 as it travels today.

On March 25, 1958, the bridge over the Cartecay River at the city limits of East Ellijay was designated the A. Charles Soule Bridge.

Major intersections

See also

References

External links

 
 Peach State Roads profile on S.R. 2

Transportation in Walker County, Georgia
Transportation in Catoosa County, Georgia
Transportation in Whitfield County, Georgia
Transportation in Murray County, Georgia
Transportation in Gilmer County, Georgia
Transportation in Fannin County, Georgia
Transportation in Union County, Georgia
Transportation in Towns County, Georgia
Transportation in Rabun County, Georgia
002
Chattahoochee-Oconee National Forest